Travist Joseph (born 23 May 1994), is a Dominican professional football player who currently plays for the Dominican national team.

He debuted on 12 August 2012 in his youth team in a qualifying campaign in a 3-1 loss to Grenada.

On 15 March 2015, he made his senior debut in a friendly match against Antigua and Barbuda team with a 1-0 defeat. He also participated in the 2018 FIFA World Cup qualification held in Russia.

On 23 March 2019, Joseph scored his first goal for Dominica against the Bahamas with a 4-0 victory, securing their qualification to League B of the CONCACAF Nations League.

International career

International goals
Scores and results list Dominica's goal tally first.

References

Dominica footballers
1994 births
Living people
Association football midfielders
Dominica international footballers